Gillies Gene Kaka (born 28 May 1990 in New Zealand) is a New Zealand rugby union player for the Hino Red Dolphins.

Career
Kaka plays for the New Zealand National Rugby Sevens team. He made his debut at the Wellington Sevens. Kaka has participated in the 2014 Commonwealth Games where New Zealand won silver. He was in the HSBC Dream Team alongside Tim Mikkelson. Kaka played for Hawkes Bay before becoming a full-time New Zealand National Rugby Sevens player. Of Māori descent, Kaka affiliates to Ngāti Kahungunu and Te Arawa.

Kaka was named in the New Zealand squad for the 2016 Summer Olympics. Kaka finished his sevens career with 33 competition appearances, 169 games, 65 tries and 807 points.

References

External links
 
 
 
 
 
 

1990 births
Living people
New Zealand rugby union players
New Zealand international rugby sevens players
Rugby sevens players at the 2016 Summer Olympics
Olympic rugby sevens players of New Zealand
People educated at Palmerston North Boys' High School
Hawke's Bay rugby union players
Commonwealth Games rugby sevens players of New Zealand
Rugby sevens players at the 2014 Commonwealth Games
New Zealand male rugby sevens players
Ngāti Kahungunu people
Te Arawa people
New Zealand Māori rugby union players
Commonwealth Games medallists in rugby sevens
Commonwealth Games silver medallists for New Zealand
Hino Red Dolphins players
Rugby union centres
Rugby union wings
Rugby union fullbacks
Bay of Plenty rugby union players
Medallists at the 2014 Commonwealth Games